Rhys W. Duch (born July 14, 1986, in Victoria, British Columbia) is a Canadian professional lacrosse player for the Colorado Mammoth of the National Lacrosse League. During high school, he played for three years at Baggataway Club in Victoria, B.C. He was a two-time Provincial and overall MVP selection, and an eight-time Provincial All-Star.

College career
Duch played college lacrosse for the Stony Brook University Seawolves.

In 2005, he was an America East All-Rookie pick. He scored two goals in the America East Championship game vs Albany (5/7); tallied three points on two goals and one assist in the win over Vermont (4/16); had one assist and one goal in the win over Hartford (4/9); recorded four points on three goals and one assist vs Army (4/5); tallied three points on two goals and one assist vs Albany (4/2); totaled three points with one goal and two assists to help boost the Brook over Wagner (3/5); registered two goals against UMass;  and tallied three points on two goals and one assist in the win over Rutgers (3/22).

In 2006, Duch as named to the All-America East second team.  He appeared in all 15 games and recorded 22 points off 15 goals and seven assists, and scooped up 16 ground balls During the season, he handed out an assist and picked up three ground balls versus Harvard (3/4); tallied a goal and recorded three ground balls at Army (3/7); dished an assist at home against Rutgers (3/28); tallied two goals in America East opening win against Vermont (4/1); tallied a goal and an assist in win over Denver (4/3); had a career game at Albany (4/8), registering six points off five goals and an assist to lead the Seawolves to victory and earn America East Player of the Week honors; recorded a goal and two assists in a win at Lehigh (4/12); registered a goal and an assist vs. Hartford (4/15); found the back of the cage three times and scooped up three ground balls in a win over in-state rival Binghamton (4/22); and scored a goal against Hofstra (4/25).

In 2007, he saw action in all 13 games for the Seawolves with a pair of starts, a pair of multi-goal games, and scored points in eight contests. He scored a goal and assist vs. Virginia (2/28); two points on a goal and assist vs. Lehigh (3/24); a pair of goals at Siena (4/10); and another pair of goals in the OT win at #20 Hofstra (4/24).

In 2008, Duch played in every game with nine starts, was named to the second team All-America East, and led the Seawolves with a career-high 28 assists.  That mark placed him seventh in the Stoney Brook record book for assists in a season. He finished fifth in the nation with his 2.0 assists per game average. He was second on the team in ground balls with a career-high 44, third on the team in points (41), and sixth in goals (13).  He finished his career 14th all-time at Stoney Brook with 106 points, with at least one point in every game but two.;  He scored three goals and a pair of assists vs. Siena (3/8); had a career high seven points (1g, 6a) at Delaware (3/15); tallied a career best six ground balls vs. Marist (3/25); scored seven points again (3g, 4a) at UMBC (3/29); and five points (1g, 4a) against Vermont (4/5) (that capped a seven-game run that saw him accumulate 33 points); and scored two assists and 10 shots against Albany (5/1) in the America East Semifinals.

WLA career
Plays for the Victoria Shamrocks.  During the 2008 season, he played in 9 games, scored 15 goals and 17 assists. He was the Shamrocks top scorer in 2007.

Statistics

NLL
Reference:

Awards

References

1986 births
Living people
Canadian lacrosse players
National Lacrosse League major award winners
San Jose Stealth players
Sportspeople from Victoria, British Columbia
Vancouver Warriors players
Washington Stealth players